Prospa is an English electronic music duo consisting of Leeds-born Harvey Blumler and Gosha Smith.

History
Blumler and Smith, both from Leeds, became friends as children. Blumler experimented with heavy dubstep sounds, while Smith stated that he used to not like dance music. Instead, he listened to metal guitar, jazz, and later, jazz hip hop. When Smith began producing music, jazz-inspired hip hop was the first genre he experimented with. The pair eventually found a mutual interest in dance music, and started producing together in 2013. They spent two years producing deep house, but stopped after they "fell out of love with the sound".

Prospa had its first major hit with "Prayer", released in October 2018. The song was picked up by Annie Mac who selected it for her "Hottest Record in the World" feature.

The pair have gone on to release their music under their own label "Rave Science", part of Polydor Records.

Musical style
The pair experimented with different musical styles. Discussing their influences, the pair cite The Chemical Brothers and Daft Punk.

Discography

EPs
Machines (2017)
Rave Science Vol. 1 (2021)

Singles
"Intended / "Get That"
"Prayer"
"The One"
"Ecstacy (Over & Over)"
"Want Need Love"

References

Musical groups from Leeds
Musical groups established in 2013
Electronic dance music duos
English dance music groups
Polydor Records artists
Deep house musicians
2013 establishments in England